The Continental Engineering Corporation Tower, or CEC Tower for short, is a skyscraper office building in Daan District, Taipei, Taiwan. It is the corporate headquarters of Continental Engineering Corporation. As of February 2021, it is the 23rd tallest building in Taipei.

Design
The tower was completed in 2002 and was designed by Kohn Pedersen Fox Associates. For the exterior of the first five floors of the building, granite panels were used with a coated double glazed façade to provide high transparency, thermal insulation and soundproofing on the north and west sides of the building. Natural sunlight can stream through the curtain wall to save on energy usage.

See also 
 List of tallest buildings in Taiwan
 List of tallest buildings in Taipei
 Continental Engineering Corporation

References

2003 establishments in Taiwan
Office buildings completed in 2003
Skyscraper office buildings in Taipei